William Blackmore may refer to:

William Blackmore (minister) (died 1684), ejected minister
William Henry Blackmore (1827–1878), English lawyer who gained a fortune by exploiting a large social network as an investment promoter